Turn Every Page: The Adventures of Robert Caro and Robert Gottlieb is a 2022 documentary film by Lizzie Gottlieb about the relationship between biographer Robert Caro and his editor, Robert Gottlieb.

Synopsis 

The film focuses on biographer Robert Caro and his editor, the documentarian's father Robert Gottlieb, as they work methodically to complete the final, fifth volume of Caro's Lyndon Johnson biography. The pair, both in their late 80s, had worked together for five decades, starting with Caro's biography of Robert Moses, The Power Broker, and continuing through Caro's first four volumes about Lyndon B. Johnson. Its story is focused on finishing the book rather than a history of their lives. The film features interviews with politicians and media personalities.

Production 

Though Caro and Gottlieb originally declined to be the subject of the documentary, after some convincing, documentarian Lizzie Gottlieb began filming them in 2016. At first, she only filmed them separately, at Caro's request, to avoid moments of contention. The film was in post-production in early 2021 and premiered at the June 2022 Tribeca Film Festival. Sony Pictures Classics acquired the film following the festival.

Critical reception

References

Further reading

External links 
 

 

2022 documentary films
2020s English-language films
American documentary films
Documentary films about writers